Squires Gate Football Club is a football club based in Squires Gate, Blackpool, Lancashire, England, formed in 1948. After spending thirty years in the West Lancashire League, in 1991 it was elected to the North West Counties Football League Division Two, and is currently in the Premier Division. They are currently the longest serving Premier Division club.

History

Blackpool & District Amateur League: 1958 to 1961
Squires Gate was formed in 1948 as Squires Gate British Legion and competed in the Blackpool & District Amateur League. The team won the League's Rawling Shield in their first season. The name of the club was changed to Squires Gate F.C. in 1953. They won the League's First Division in 1955–56 and 1956–57; also the Blackwell Cup in 1958–59 and 1959–60. They spent the 1960–61 in the Fylde District League, winning the Fylde Cup and being the losing finalists in the Bannister Cup.

West Lancashire League: 1961 to 1991
The following season the club moved up to the West Lancashire League, where it spent the next thirty years. From 1961 until 1980 it was in Division Two, being promoted in 1981 as champions. In the 1986–87 season the side won the Richardson Cup.

North West Counties League: 1991 onward
They were elected into the North West Counties Football League for the 1991–92 season, joining Division Two for the 1991–92 season. Squires Gate won the leagues Fair Play Award for the 1993–94 season and were losing finalists in the 1997–98 Division Two Trophy.

They won the 2001–02 season Division Two Trophy and then the following season they missed the runner-up spot on goal difference but were still promoted to Division One following the demise of Stand Athletic F.C. who had originally been promoted as Division Two champions. They reached their highest league placing in the 2005–06 season, also reaching the quarter finals of the FA Vase.

On 10 March 2007, Squires Gate played a home match against FC United of Manchester at Curzon Ashton's ground. The club had approached Blackpool about playing the game at Bloomfield Road but the ground was not available. The team played the match in Ashton-under-Lyne, as it was felt that FCUM fans were more likely to attend with the match being staged in the Greater Manchester area. A crowd of 1,650 saw Squires Gate lose 0–1, the club earning about £7,000.

In the summer of 2012, Gate changed its Stadium name to The Royal British Legion Stadium.

On 12 November 2014; Jack Sowerby, signed for League One outfit Fleetwood Town. He now plays football for Northampton Town. 

On 25 April 2015, Gate manager Dave McCann led his team to the club's highest-ever position, reaching sixth position in the NWCFL Premier Division, finishing with 67 points after playing Alsager Town. The Squires Gate team that played that day were: Fletcher, Richards, Westwood, Anderson, Ferguson, Mckenna, Penswick, Kay, Dunn, Murphy, Buchan. Subs: McCann, Lancashire, Rowley, Cunningham.

The following season, manager Dave McCann's resignation was reluctantly accepted by club chairman Stuart Hopwood; he was replaced by club captain Daniel Penswick. Penswick led Gate to a 19th-place finish in the 2015–16 season, with a last-day win over Ashton Athletic, to remain in the Premier Division.

Another success story came from Squires Gate, as Josh Kay went on to play for AFC Fylde, before eventually getting a move to Barnsley in 2015. He now plays for League Two side Barrow AFC. 

Luke Evans was appointed manager of the club in October 2019. Evans led the club to 9th in his first season at Squires Gate before the season was deemed null and void due to the coronavirus pandemic. 

There were many changes made off the pitch before the 2019–20 season, with a new home changing room being fitted. Squires Gate were selected for BBC coverage for their FA Cup Extra Preliminary tie with Maine Road, which was played at Prestwich Heys. Gate went on to win the match 5-0; a hat trick from Dean Ing, and goals from Elliott Pond and Jake Higham rounded off a fantastic night for the club. It has been a major boost for the club, and has helped increase home attendances.

Ground
The club play at The Brian Addison Stadium, which is named after club president Brian Addison. It has seen some development since the club was elected to the North West Counties League. There is a clubhouse at the ground and floodlights. The record attendance at School Road is 600, for a pre-season friendly against Everton in 1995.

Honours

League
Blackpool & District Amateur League, First Division champions (2): 1956, 1957
West Lancashire League, Division Two champions (1): 1981

Cup
Rawling Shield winners (1): 1949
Blackwell Cup winners (2): 1959, 1960
Fylde Cup winners (1): 1961
Bannister Cup runners-up (1): 1961
Richardson Cup winners (1): 1987
North West Counties League Division Two Trophy winners (1): 2002
North West Counties League Division Two Trophy runners-up (1): 1998

Records
Best League performance: 6th, North West Counties League Premier Division, 2014-15
Best FA Cup performance: Second qualifying round, 2001–02, 2004–05, 2021-22
Best FA Vase performance: Quarter-final, 2005–06

References

External links
Official website
Club profile at NW Counties League

Football clubs in England
Football clubs in Lancashire
Association football clubs established in 1948
1948 establishments in England
Sport in Blackpool
West Lancashire Football League
North West Counties Football League clubs